Philip Arnold Goodwin (January 20, 1882 – June 6, 1937) was a Republican member of the United States House of Representatives from New York.

Goodwin was born in Athens, New York. He was in the steel bridge construction business in Albany, New York from 1902 until 1916. From 1916 until his death he owned and operated a lumber business in Coxsackie, New York. He was elected to Congress in 1932 and represented New York's 27th congressional district from March 4, 1933, until his death in Coxsackie, New York.

See also
 List of United States Congress members who died in office (1900–49)

Sources

1882 births
1937 deaths
People from Greene County, New York
Republican Party members of the United States House of Representatives from New York (state)
20th-century American politicians